Maria Elana Astrologes Combs (born August 10, 1951) is an American professional golfer who played on the LPGA Tour. She played under her maiden name, Maria Astrologes, until her marriage in 1979.

Astrologes won once on the LPGA Tour in 1975.

Professional wins

LPGA Tour wins (1)

LPGA Tour playoff record (1–0)

References

American female golfers
LPGA Tour golfers
Golfers from Indiana
University of New Mexico alumni
People from Valparaiso, Indiana
1951 births
Living people
21st-century American women